Anthracoceros is a genus of birds in the family Bucerotidae.

The genus was introduced by the German naturalist Ludwig Reichenbach in 1849. The type species was subsequently designated as the Malabar pied hornbill (Anthracoceros coronatus). The name is a combination of the Ancient Greek words ανθραξ anthrax, ανθρακος anthrakos meaning "coal black" and κερας keras, κερως kerōs meaning "horn". A molecular phylogenetic study published in 2013 found that Anthracoceros was sister to the genus Ocyceros which contains the three grey hornbill species.

The genus contains five species:

References

 
Bird genera
Taxa named by Ludwig Reichenbach